Ernst Eduard Kummer (29 January 1810 – 14 May 1893) was a German mathematician. Skilled in applied mathematics, Kummer trained German army officers in ballistics; afterwards, he taught for 10 years in a gymnasium, the German equivalent of high school, where he inspired the mathematical career of Leopold Kronecker.

Life
Kummer was born in Sorau, Brandenburg (then part of Prussia). He was awarded a PhD from the University of Halle in 1831 for writing a prize-winning mathematical essay (De cosinuum et sinuum potestatibus secundum cosinus et sinus arcuum multiplicium evolvendis), which was eventually published a year later.

In 1840, Kummer married Ottilie Mendelssohn, daughter of Nathan Mendelssohn and Henriette Itzig. Ottilie was a cousin of Felix Mendelssohn and his sister Rebecca Mendelssohn Bartholdy, the wife of the mathematician Peter Gustav Lejeune Dirichlet. His second wife (whom he married soon after the death of Ottilie in 1848), Bertha Cauer, was a maternal cousin of Ottilie. Overall, he had 13 children. His daughter Marie married the mathematician Hermann Schwarz. Kummer retired from teaching and from mathematics in 1890 and died three years later in Berlin.

Mathematics
Kummer made several contributions to mathematics in different areas; he codified some of the relations between different hypergeometric series, known as contiguity relations. The Kummer surface results from taking the quotient of a two-dimensional abelian variety by the cyclic group {1, −1} (an early orbifold: it has 16 singular points, and its geometry was intensively studied in the nineteenth century).

Kummer also proved Fermat's Last Theorem for a considerable class of prime exponents (see regular prime, ideal class group). His methods were closer, perhaps, to p-adic ones than to ideal theory as understood later, though the term 'ideal' was invented by Kummer. He studied what were later called Kummer extensions of fields: that is, extensions generated by adjoining an nth root to a field already containing a primitive nth root of unity. This is a significant extension of the theory of quadratic extensions, and the genus theory of quadratic forms (linked to the 2-torsion of the class group). As such, it is still foundational for class field theory.

Kummer further conducted research in ballistics and, jointly with William Rowan Hamilton he investigated 
ray systems.

Publications

See also
 Kummer configuration
 Kummer's congruence
 Kummer series
 Kummer theory
 Kummer's theorem, on prime-power divisors of binomial coefficients
 Kummer's function
 Kummer sum
 Kummer variety
 Kummer–Vandiver conjecture
 Kummer's transformation of series
 Ideal number
 Regular prime
 Reflection theorem
 Principalization
 25628 Kummer – asteroid named after Ernst Kummer

References

 Eric Temple Bell, Men of Mathematics, Simon and Schuster, New York: 1986.
 R. W. H. T. Hudson, Kummer's Quartic Surface, Cambridge, [1905] rept. 1990.
 "Ernst Kummer," in Dictionary of Scientific Biography, ed. C. Gillispie, NY: Scribners 1970–90.

External links

 
 
 Biography of Ernst Kummer
 

1810 births
1893 deaths
People from Żary
19th-century German mathematicians
Number theorists
German Lutherans
People from the Province of Brandenburg
Martin Luther University of Halle-Wittenberg alumni
Academic staff of the University of Breslau
Academic staff of the Humboldt University of Berlin
Academic staff of the Technical University of Berlin
Mendelssohn family
Members of the French Academy of Sciences
Foreign Members of the Royal Society
Corresponding members of the Saint Petersburg Academy of Sciences